Ralph Spirk (born 26 October 1986) is an Austrian football coach and a former player. He is an assistant coach with Grazer AK.

Club career
Spirk made his professional debut at Grazer AK in the 2006/2007 season only to move to LASK Linz at the end of the season. He didn't experience much playing time in Linz however and in summer 2008, Spirk was loaned out for a year to Austrian Second Division side DSV Leoben.

External links
Player profile - DSV Leoben

References

1986 births
Living people
People from Leoben
Austrian footballers
Association football midfielders
Grazer AK players
LASK players
Kapfenberger SV players
FC Wacker Innsbruck (2002) players
Austrian Football Bundesliga players
Austrian football managers
Grazer AK managers
Footballers from Styria